McSheffrey is a surname. Notable people with the surname include:

Bryan McSheffrey (born 1952), Canadian ice hockey player
Gary McSheffrey (born 1982), English footballer
Shannon McSheffrey, Canadian historian